Ammari is a district in Tissemsilt Province, Algeria. It was named after its capital, Ammari.

Municipalities
The district is further divided into 3 municipalities:
Ammari
Sidi Abed 
Maassem

Districts of Tissemsilt Province